Notonecta indica is a species of backswimmer in the family Notonectidae. It is found in the Caribbean Sea, Central America, North America, Oceania, and South America.

References

Notonecta
Articles created by Qbugbot
Insects described in 1771
Taxa named by Carl Linnaeus